SoundTeMP is a Korean team of video game music composers. Formed in 1992, they have been creating soundtracks for MMORPG computer games. By 2002, their work in Ragnarok Online (a highly acclaimed early MMORPG) made them famous. Their most recent work is in the MMORPG Tree of Savior.

Another international MMORPG using game music from SoundTeMP since 2003 is FlyFF, which comes from Korea as well.

SoundTeMP Members
Lee Seock-Jin (BlueBlue)
Kwon Goo-Hee (Goopal)
Kwak Dong-Il (Sevin) (1993–2004)
Jang Seong-Woon (Nikacha)
Park Jin-Bae (Silhouetti, ESTi)
Park Soo-Il
Nam Goo-Min (Nauts)

List of MMORPGs featuring music from SoundTeMP
Flyff
Granado Espada
Ragnarok Online
Neo Steam: The Shattered Continent
4leaf (2000・SOFTMAX)
Talesweaver
La Tale
Tree of Savior
Seal Online
Corum Online (2003・Netclue)
Yogurting (2004・Neowiz)
Silkroad Online (2004・Joymax)
RF Online (RF Online, 2004・CCR)

List of other games featuring music from SoundTeMP
Ys II Special (1994・Mantra, arrange)
Lychnis (1994・Softmax, arrange)
Genocide 2 (1995・Mantra, arrange)
Astrocounter of CRESCENTS (1996・S&T On-Line/Samsung)
Icekiss (1997・Object Square, freeware)
The Rhapsody of Zephyr (1998・Softmax)
Ant Man 2 (1998・Gravity)
Merturl Wizard (1998・OSC)
Leithian (1999・Kama Digital Entertainment)
The War of Genesis III (1999・Softmax)
Fortress series (CCR)
Arcturus (2000・Sonnori/Gravity)
Narsillion (2002・Grigon Entertainment)
Dream Chaser (2002・SOFTMAX)
Cheollang Yeoljeon (2003・Grigon Entertainment)
Magna Carta (2004・SOFTMAX)
PangYa (2004・Ntreev Soft)
DJ MAX / DJ MAX online
Princess Maker series

Musical style
Their soundtracks in MMORPG ranged from trance/techno, electronic to instrumental, ambient and new-age. SoundTeMP are often acclaimed for their wide experimentation with game audio styles, mixing various genres together to produce unique tracks.

References

External links

Misc info about SoundTeMP (JP)

www.last.fm information

1992 establishments in South Korea
Video game composers
Video game musicians